Carlos Rodríguez Molina (born 17 February 1988) is a Spanish footballer who last played for Hong Kong Premier League club Southern as a forward.

Club career
Born in Albacete, Castile-La Mancha, Carlos kicked off his career in 2006 with Imperial Promesas in Tercera División. He subsequently went on to represent clubs in the same tier until 2013 when his club La Hoya Lorca CF was promoted to the Segunda División B. In September of the same year, he dislocated his ankle during training. He was consequently operated on, and the club announced that it would take four months for him to recover.

After playing two seasons with La Hoya Lorca, Carlos signed for CD Alcoyano in 2014. However, without having played a single match for Alcoyano, he was loaned to fc barcelona  for a year. He scored 11 goals in 31 games for the Balearic Islands club. In July 2015, he moved to UCAM Murcia CF. His debut came in a 2–0 victory against Almería B where he found the net in the ninety-first minute.

After failing to be a regular in the first team, in January 2016, Carlos' was released by his club and his contract was terminated. In the following month, he signed with Lleida Esportiu, penning a deal keeping him in the club until the end of the season. On 3 April, he scored a hat-trick against his former club Atlético Baleares. After a short stint with Mérida AD, he signed with Hong Kong club Southern District FC joining Spaniard Carles Embuena, Diego Garrido and Marcos Jiménez.

References

External links

1988 births
Living people
Sportspeople from Albacete
Spanish footballers
Footballers from Castilla–La Mancha
Association football forwards
Segunda División B players
Tercera División players
Cartagena FC players
Lorca FC players
CD Atlético Baleares footballers
UCAM Murcia CF players
Lleida Esportiu footballers
Mérida AD players
Hong Kong Premier League players
Southern District FC players
Spanish expatriate footballers
Spanish expatriate sportspeople in Hong Kong
Expatriate footballers in Hong Kong
Mar Menor FC players